John Wells may refer to:

Entertainment
John B. Wells, American talk radio host and voice actor
John Barnes Wells (1880–1935), tenor vocalist
John K. Wells (fl. 1920s), American filmmaker in Australia
John Wells (artist) (1907–2000), Cornish painter
John Wells (filmmaker) (born 1956), theater and television producer and writer
John Wells (poet), winner of Eric Gregory Award
John Wells (satirist) (1936–1998), British satirist
John Wells or John Wels, screen name of Gian Maria Volonté in A Fistful of Dollars
John Wells (sportscaster) (born 1946), Canadian sportscaster
Jack Wells (sportscaster) (John Hampson Wells, 1911–1999), radio and TV broadcaster
John Wellington Wells, fictional character in the series J.W. Wells & Co by Tom Holt
John Wellington Wells, fictional title character of The Sorcerer by Gilbert and Sullivan
John Wells, fictional character in the self-titled spy fiction series by Alex Berenson
John Warren Wells, a pseudonym used by Lawrence Block

Politics
John Wells (MP for Maidstone, 1820–1830) (1761–1848), British MP for Maidstone
Sir John Wells (MP for Maidstone, 1959–1987) (1925–2017), British Conservative MP for Maidstone
John Wells (Nova Scotia politician) (1772–?), merchant and political figure in Nova Scotia
John Wells (New York politician) (1817–1877), member of the House of Representatives, 1851–1853
John M. Wells, member of the Wisconsin State Assembly, 1849
John S. Wells (1803–1860), senator from New Hampshire

Religion
John Wells (Mormon) (1864–1941), general authority of The Church of Jesus Christ of Latter-day Saints
John Wells (priest), Archdeacon of Ludlow
John Wells (minister), see Morning Exercises
John Wells (bishop), Bishop of Llandaff

Sports
John Wells (baseball) (1922–1993), pitcher in Major League Baseball
John Wells (cricketer) (1760–1835), English cricketer
John Wells (jockey) (1833–1873), British champion jockey
John Wells (rower) (1859–1929), represented the United States at the 1904 Summer Olympics
John Wells (rugby union) (born 1963), English rugby union footballer and coach
John Wells (rugby league) from Stanley Rangers
John Wells (soccer) from Colorado Springs Blizzard
John Wells (sports administrator) (born 1943), New Zealand sports administrator and businessman
John Wells (outfielder) in 1978 College World Series
Jack Wells (footballer) (John Wells, 1883–1966), Australian rules footballer

Other
John Wells (architect) (1789–1864), architect whose works include the Bank of Montreal Head Office, Montreal
John Wells-Thorpe (born 1928), English architect
John Wells (Massachusetts judge) (died 1875), member of the Massachusetts Supreme Judicial Court
Sir John Wells (Royal Navy officer) (1763–1841), admiral who fought at the Battle of Camperdown
John A. Wells, lawyer and founder of law firm Roger & Wells
John C. Wells (born 1939), British linguist, phonetician and Esperantist
John Keith Wells (1922–2016), U.S. Marine recipient of the Navy Cross for action during the Battle of Iwo Jima
John Morgan Wells (1940–2017), marine biologist and physiologist
John W. Wells (1907–1995), American paleontologist, biologist, and geologist

See also 
John Welles (disambiguation)
Jonathan Wells (disambiguation)
Jack Wells (disambiguation)